Acontia clerana is a moth of the family Noctuidae. It is found in Western Australia, New South Wales and Queensland.

Its wingspan is about 20 mm. Adults have off-white forewings, with dark brown markings in the marginal halves. The hindwings are brown, fading somewhat toward the base.

External links
Australian Faunal Directory
Australian Insects

Moths of Australia
clerana
Moths described in 1902